The , officially the , is a Japanese funicular line in Ōtsu, Shiga. It is the only line  operates. The line opened in 1927, as an eastern route to Enryaku-ji, a famous temple on Mount Hiei. This is the longest funicular line in Japan.

Basic data
Distance: 
Gauge: 
Stations: 4
Vertical interval:

Stations

See also
Keifuku Cable Line – on the other side of the mountain
List of funicular railways
List of railway companies in Japan
List of railway lines in Japan

External links
 Official website 

Funicular railways in Japan
Rail transport in Shiga Prefecture
1067 mm gauge railways in Japan
Japanese companies established in 1927
Railway companies established in 1927